The Gyrodyne QH-50 DASH (Drone Anti-Submarine Helicopter) is a small drone helicopter built by Gyrodyne Company of America for use as a long-range anti-submarine weapon on ships that would otherwise be too small to operate a full-sized helicopter. It remained in production until 1969. Several are still used today for various land-based roles.

Design and development
DASH was a major part of the United States Navy's Fleet Rehabilitation and Modernization (FRAM) program of the late 1950s.  FRAM was started because the Soviet Union was building submarines faster than the US could build anti-submarine frigates. Instead of building frigates, the FRAM upgrade series allowed the US to rapidly update by converting older ships that were less useful in modern naval combat.  The navy could upgrade the sonar on World War II-era destroyers but needed a stand-off weapon to attack at the perimeter of the sonar's range.  The old destroyers had little room for add-ons such as a full flight deck. The original DASH concept was a light drone helicopter that could release a nuclear depth charge or torpedoes.  The aircraft was considered expendable.

The manned Gyrodyne Rotorcycle program of the mid-1950s provided prototype work for the DASH, and ultimately the Rotorcycle was modified to produce the initial drone version, the DSN-1/QH-50A The DSN-1 was powered by a Porsche YO-95-6 72 hp piston engine and carried one Mark 43 homing torpedo. The next developmental version was the DSN-2/QH-50B that was powered by two Porsche YO-95-6 engines and also carried a single Mk 43. Serial production of the DASH began with the third version, the DSN-3/QH-50C, in which a  Boeing T50-4 turboshaft engine replaced the piston engine and the payload was increased to two Mark 44 torpedoes. A total of 378 QH-50Cs were produced before production ended in January 1966.

A single QH-50A, (DS-1006), which had been retired in 1961 after contractor testing, was re-activated in 1964 to test tilt-float landing gear. A long cylindrical float was added to each corner of the extended skid framework. Each float could rotate 90° from horizontal, oriented to straight ahead, and incorporated a pad at the end for landing on hard surfaces. For landing on water the floats were rotated to the vertical position and the helicopter settled until the floats were approximately 75% submerged, giving a high degree of stability.

Operations

The DASH's control scheme had two controllers: one on the flight deck, and another in the combat information center.  The flight-deck controller handled take-off and landing.  The controller in the Combat Information Center (CIC) would fly DASH to the target's location and release weapons using semiautomated controls and radar.  The CIC controller could not see the aircraft or its altitude and occasionally lost operational control or situational awareness.  Late in the program, there were successful experiments to add a TV camera to the drone. These DASH SNOOPYs were also used as airborne spotters for naval gunfire.

A tethered landing system was developed to land and take off in up to Force-6 seas.  This system consisted of steel rails that were screwed to the flight deck and a cable system to pull the helicopter out of the hangar bay.  The helicopter was attached to the steel rails so that it would not slide off the flight deck in heavy seas.  This system was occasionally set up and used aboard ship, but never used in rough seas to launch a helicopter.

The DASH came about because Gyrodyne had worked with the United States Marine Corps to develop a small, experimental co-axial helicopter, the RON Rotorcycle, for use as a scouting platform. A co-axial helicopter has two contrarotating main rotors to control torque, unlike the more common main rotor/tail rotor found on most helicopters. Co-axial rotors put more power into lift, allowing shorter rotor blades.  Both traits help a helicopter to be as small as possible. On the downside, the blades must be kept very far from each other to avoid colliding, since the blades flex as they rotate. This leads to increased complexity and decreased manoeuvrability.

For a drone, these trade-offs were fine. For the DASH role, the original marine version had a turboshaft engine for improved performance and the replacement of the seats and controls with a remote-control system and stowage for two Mark 44 torpedoes.

Since it was expendable, DASH used off-the-shelf industrial electronics with no back-ups.  The controls were multi-channel analog FM.  Over 80% of operational aircraft losses were traced to single-point failures of the electronics.  A total of 10% of the losses were from pilot errors, and only 10% of the losses were from engine or airframe failures.

The DASH program was canceled in 1969 and withdrawn from service 1968–1973. DASHes proved unreliable in shipboard service, with over half of the US Navy's 746 drones lost at sea. This was possibly due to inadequate maintenance support, as other services had few difficulties with their DASHes. Although low reliability was the official reason, the manufacturer pointed to the expenses of the Vietnam War, and the lack of need for antisubmarine capability in that war.

Modified DASH vehicles continued to operate for several more years in the Vietnam War. With attached television cameras, they were used as remote artillery spotters and organic reconnaissance by their ships.

Until May 2006, a small number of QH-50D DASH drones were operated by the United States Army at White Sands Missile Range, where they were used to tow targets and calibrate radars and electronic systems.

The Japanese Maritime Self-Defense Force (JMSDF) operated a fleet of 20 QH-50 drones, for use on its Takatsuki-class and Minegumo-class destroyers. Because the JMSDF regarded the DASH operation as highly prestigious and the aircraft were flown and serviced regularly, they suffered a much lower loss rate than the US Navy. However, with the difficulty of maintaining DASH operations after the termination of the U.S. program, the drones and associated equipment were removed from JMSDF service in 1977.

Variants

DSN-1U.S. Navy designation for nine pre-production aircraft, redesignated QH-50A in 1962.
DSN-2U.S. Navy designation for three pre-production aircraft, redesignated QH-50B in 1962.
DSN-3U.S. Navy designation for 373 production aircraft, redesignated QH-50C in 1962.
QH-50ADSN-1 redesignated in 1962, nine pre-production aircraft for evaluation, with a 72 hp (54 kW) Porsche flat-four piston engine.
QH-50BDSN-2 redesignated in 1962, three pre-production aircraft powered by two 86 hp (64.5 kW) Porsche flat-four piston engines.
QH-50CDSN-3 redesignated in 1962, production aircraft powered by a 300 shp (225 kW) Boeing T50-8A turboshaft engine, 373 built.

QH-50D Production aircraft with a larger  Boeing T50-12 turboshaft engine, fibreglass rotor blades, increased fuel capacity, and no tail assembly. 377 built.
QH-50DM There were 10 modified QH-50Ds manufactured (Serial number 150AO- 160AO). The "DM" 550shp was supplied by a modified version of the Boeing T50-12.  These were used for military reconnaissance for the United States Army during the Vietnam War.
YQH-50E Three QH-50D aircraft modified with Allison T63-A-5A engines.
QH-50F Proposed production version of YQH-50E, not built.
QH-50H Proposed twin-engine version of QH-50F with larger fuselage and rotors, not built.

Operators

 Japan Maritime Self-Defense Force

 United States Navy
 United States Army

Surviving aircraft

Specifications (QH-50C)

See also

References

Notes

Bibliography
 Apostolo, Giorgio. The Illustrated Encyclopedia of Helicopters. New York: Bonanza Books, 1984. .
 .

 Taylor, John W.R. Jane's All The World's Aircraft 1969–70. London: Jane's Yearbooks, 1969.

External links

 QH-50 DASH History on Gyrodyne Helicopters site
 QH-50 DASH in U.S. Navy Service
 QH-50 DASH in Japanese Navy Service
 Gyrodyne DSN/QH-50 DASH on designation-systems.net
 Gyrodyne DNS/QH-50 DASH Production List in helis.com database

H-50
1950s United States helicopters
1950s United States military utility aircraft
Single-turbine helicopters
Coaxial rotor helicopters
Unmanned aerial vehicles of the United States
Unmanned helicopters
United States military helicopters
Aircraft first flown in 1959